This is a listing of official releases by Phil Keaggy, an American acoustic and electric guitarist and vocalist.

Studio albums
 What a Day, 1973
 Love Broke Thru, 1976
 Emerging Phil Keaggy Band, 1977, reissued on CD in 2000 as Re-Emerging minus one song plus four new ones
 The Master and the Musician, 1978 instrumental album, later reissued on CD with bonus track. A 30th anniversary edition was released in 2008 and included a bonus disc of alternate takes and an interview.
 Ph'lip Side, 1980, released in two versions (one song different and in different sequence)
 Town to Town, 1981
 Play thru Me, 1982
 Underground, 1983, later reissued on CD with bonus tracks and different track sequence
 Getting Closer!, 1985, later reissued on CD with a different track sequence and bonus material
 Way Back Home, (original) 1986
 The Wind and the Wheat, 1987, instrumental album
 Phil Keaggy and Sunday's Child, 1988
 Find Me in These Fields, 1990
 Beyond Nature, 1991, instrumental album
 Revelator, 1993, six-track EP preview of the album Crimson and Blue, with abridged and extended versions of "John the Revelator"
 Crimson and Blue, 1993
 Blue, 1994
 Way Back Home, (reissue) 1994, heavily revised version of 1986 album
 True Believer, 1995
 Acoustic Sketches, 1996, instrumental album
 220, 1996, instrumental album
 On the Fly, 1997, instrumental album
 Phil Keaggy, 1998
 Premium Jams, 1999, double instrumental album
 Music to Paint By: Still Life, 1999, instrumental album
 Music to Paint By: Electric Blue, 1999, instrumental album
 Music to Paint By: Splash, 1999, instrumental album
 Music to Paint By: Brushstrokes, 1999, instrumental album
 Majesty and Wonder, 1999, Christmas album
 An Angel's Christmas, 1999, Christmas album
 Inseparable, 2000, released in a two disc version (21 tracks), then later in the year as a single disc (17 tracks)
 Uncle Duke, 2000, lyrics written originally as poetry by Keaggy's uncle Dave "Duke" Keaggy
 Zion, 2000
 Lights of Madrid, 2000, instrumental album
 Cinemascapes, 2001, instrumental album
 In the Quiet Hours, 2001, instrumental album
 Hymnsongs, 2002, instrumental album
 Freehand (Acoustic Sketches II), 2003, acoustic instrumental album
 Special Occasions, 2003
 It's Personal, 2004, lyrics originally written as poetry by Keith Moore
 Uncle Duke, 2005, re-issue of Uncle Duke, with bonus material
 Jammed!, 2006, instrumental album. Selections and remixes from Premium Jams, with bonus material.
 Roundabout, 2006, instrumental album
 Dream Again, 2006
 Two of Us, 2006, instrumental album with Mike Pachelli
 Acoustic Cafe, 2007. Primarily an album of covers, many of which are duets. Guest vocalists include Randy Stonehill.
 The Song Within, 2007, acoustic instrumental album
 Phantasmagorical: Master and Musician 2, 2008, instrumental album
 Welcome Inn, 2009, Christmas album
 Frio Suite, 2009, instrumental album with Jeff Johnson
 Inter-Dimensional Traveler, 2010, instrumental album. The album is the debut project from "The Phil Keaggy Trio", a group consisting of Keaggy, keyboardist Jack Giering and Glass Harp drummer John Sferra.
 Songs for Israel, 2010, includes Randy Stonehill, Bob Bennett and Buck Storm
 Cosmic Rumpus, 2011, instrumental album. The album is the second project from "The Phil Keaggy Trio" but now credited as "The Jack Giering Trio", a group consisting of Keaggy, keyboardist Jack Giering and Glass Harp drummer John Sferra.
 Live from Kegworth Studio, 2012.
 The Cover of Love, 2012.
 WaterSky, 2012, instrumental album with Jeff Johnson
 Infinity Unleashed, 2014, instrumental album. The album is the third project from "The Phil Keaggy Trio" but now credited as "John Sferra Trio", a group consisting of Keaggy, keyboardist Jack Giering and drummer John Sferra.
 All at Once, 2016, via a Kickstarter campaign.

Live albums
 Phil Kägi, 2006, two-disc set from the 2006 Swiss Tour (Switzerland release only)
With 2nd Chapter of Acts and "A Band Called David"
 How the West Was One, 1977
With Randy Stonehill
 Together Live!, 2005
Compassion All-Star Band
 1 By 1 (One by One) Live!, 1988. In addition to Keaggy, the band features Margaret Becker (vocals, guitar), Randy Stonehill (vocals, guitar), John Andrew Schreiner (keyboards, vocals), Rick Cua (bass, vocals), Mike Mead (drums, percussion) and Joe English (drums, percussion, vocals).
With Glass Harp
 Live at Carnegie Hall, 1997. This concert had originally been recorded in 1971 but remained in the vaults until 1997. One track, "Do Lord", appeared on Keaggy's compilation album Time: 1970-1995 prior to the official release of Live at Carnegie Hall.
 Strings Attached, 2000 (double album). This collection also features live versions of several Keaggy solo tunes such as "From the Beginning", "Chalice", "Inseparable", "John the Revelator", "True Believer", "Shades of Green", "Overture (for Guitar and Orchestra)", and "Tender Love".
 Stark Raving Jams, 2004 (triple album). Includes live versions of Keaggy's solo material such as "Salvation Army Band" (listed as "SAB Jam") and "Nothing But the Blood of Jesus".
 Glass Harp Live at the Beachland Ballroom 11.01.08.

Compilations
 Prime Cuts, 1987 UK release only. Features selected tracks from Keaggy's 1980-85 albums
 The Best of Keaggy: The Early Years 1973-1978, 1989 (unauthorized release)
 Time 1: 1970-1995, 1995
 Time 2: 1970-1995, 1995
 What Matters, 2001. This nine-song compilation draws mostly from the albums Phil Keaggy and Crimson and Blue. "Tell Me How You Feel" from Sunday's Child is also included as is a new song "What Matters". The album was produced and released exclusively for the International Bible Society.
 History Makers, 2003
 Happy Valentine's Day, 2006. This limited edition release showcased various love songs that Phil had recorded over the years.

Soundtrack albums
 Southern Girls, from the 2012 film by Carl Jackson. Available for download (only) from iTunes and Amazon. The movie and soundtrack feature a collection of previously released Keaggy material.

On tribute albums
 No Compromise: Remembering the Music of Keith Green, Various Artists, 1992. Keaggy contributes backing vocals to Russ Taff's rendition of "Your Love Broke Through". Keaggy had previously recorded his own version of the song for his 1976 album Love Broke Thru
 Strong Hand of Love: A Tribute to Mark Heard, Various Artists, 1994. Keaggy contributes a recording of Heard's "I Always Do", a song featured first on his Phil Keaggy and Sunday's Child album in 1988.
 Orphans of God, Various Artists, 1996. This is a second tribute album to Mark Heard. Keaggy sings and plays on a remake of "Everything is All Right". Keaggy originally recorded the song featured for his 1988 album Phil Keaggy and Sunday's Child.
 The Jesus Record, Rich Mullins & A Ragamuffin Band, 1998. Keaggy performs "All the Way to Kingdom Come".
 Coming Up! A Tribute to Paul McCartney, Various Artists, 2001. Keaggy sings and plays on a cover version of "Somedays", a song that McCartney originally recorded for his 1997 album Flaming Pie.
 Making God Smile: A Tribute to Beach Boy Brian Wilson, Various Artists, 2002. Keaggy sings and plays on a cover version of "Good Vibrations".
 Come Together: America Salutes The Beatles, Various Artists, 2003. Keaggy and PFR team up for a remake of "We Can Work It Out".
 Full Circle: A Celebration of Songs and Friends, Charlie Peacock, 2004. A collection of Charlie Peacock songs re-recorded by various artists. Keaggy and Bela Fleck provide instrumental backing to Sarah Groves' vocals on "In the Light".
 A Musical Tribute To C.S. Lewis, Various Artists, 2005. Keaggy song "Addison's Walk" from Beyond Nature
 Life is Precious: A Tribute to Wes King, Various Artists, 2006. Keaggy contributes a rendering of "Getting Used to the Darkness".
 Yesterday: A Tribute to John Lennon and Paul McCartney, 2006, with Pat Coil and Mark Douthit. Keaggy sings and plays guitar on "And I Love Her".

Other collaborations
 25 Songs of Christmas, Various Artists, 1982. Includes Keaggy's instrumental version of "We Three Kings".
 Exercise for Life, Various Artists, 1983. Album from Stormie Omartian. Keaggy's song "Just a Moment Away" included.
 C.A.U.S.E. (Christian Artists United to Save the Earth), Various Artists, 1985. Keaggy, along with many other Christian artists, contributed to the making of audio and video recording of the song, "Do Something Now."
 Fight the Fight: Rescue the Unborn, Various Artists, 1985.
 Shake: Christian Artists Face the Music, Various Artists, 1988. Interviews, songs, and snippets featuring artists on the Myrrh label.
 Our Hymns, Various Artists, 1989. Keaggy contributes a cover of "O God Our Help in Ages Past".
 Our Christmas, Various Artists, 1990. Keaggy sings a duet with Kim Hill on "God Rest Ye Merry Gentlemen." Hill also arranged the song.
 The Rock Revival: Feeling the Spirit, Vol. 1, Various Artists, 1991. Includes Keaggy's work with Paul Clark on "Listen Closely" and "Song of Love" with Keaggy, Paul Clark, Mike Burhart, John Mehler and Jay Truax.
 New Young Messiah, Various Artists, 1993. Keaggy plays the instrumental "Pastorale".
 Love Songs for a Lifetime-30 Great Love Songs, Various Artists, 1996. Keaggy sings "What A Wonder You Are" with Michele Pillar.
 Sing Me to Sleep, Daddy, Various Artists, 1997. Keaggy performs "Brahms' Lullaby".
 Surfonic Water Revival, 1998. Keaggy plays guitar on "Surfer's Paradise" and "California Blue".
 Seize the Day and Other Stories, Carolyn Arends, 2000. Keaggy adds electric guitar on the live "Go with God".
 The Prayer of Jabez Music: a Worship Experience, Various Artists, 2001. Keaggy and Geoff Moore team up for the duet "Touch of Greatness".
 City on a Hill: Sing Alleluia, Various Artists, 2002. Keaggy plays guitar on "The Lord's Prayer", and sings on "Communion".
 One, Neal Morse, 2004. Keaggy has a guitar solo during the songs "The Creation" and "The Separated Man", and sings a duet with Neal on the song "Cradle to the Grave".
 His Passion (the Christ): Remembering the Sacrifice, Various Artists, 2004. Keaggy sings a version of the old spiritual "Were You There When They Crucified My Lord".
 Behold the Lamb of God, Andrew Peterson and Various Artists, 2004
 Sweet Dreams and Starry Nights, Various Artists, 2005. Keaggy performs "Brahms' Lullaby".
 Christmas Treasures, Various Artists, 2006. Keaggy contributes acoustic instrumental versions of "Coventry Carol" and "In the Bleak Midwinter".
 Resurrection Worship, Various Artists, 2009. Keaggy contributed the song "He is Risen".
 CPR 3, Various Artists, 2009. Keaggy contributes a re-recorded version of the song "Passport". The original version appears on Keaggy's 1995 album Sounds.
 Far Away from Everyday, Brad Hoyt, 2013. Keaggy collaborated on the song "Look Inside".
 The Courts of the King: The Worship Music of Ted Sandquist, 1977. Worship music album that includes artists Nedra Ross, Ted Sandquist, Lynn Nichols, Phil Madeira, Terry Anderson and The Love Inn Company

With The Squires
 Unofficial Demo (c. 1966)
 Official Demo; recorded at United Audio studios, (c. 1966)
 "Batmobile" (single), "I Don't Care" (b-side); Penguin Records (c. 1966)

With The New Hudson Exit
 "Come with Me" (single), "Waiting For Her" (b-side); Date Records (c. 1967)

With Glass Harp
Singles
 "Where Did My World Come From?", 1969. B-side: "She Told Me".
Albums
 Glass Harp, 1970
 Synergy, 1971
 It Makes Me Glad, 1972
 Song in the Air, 1977 (Compilation album)
 Live at Carnegie Hall, 1997
 Strings Attached, 2000
 Hour Glass, 2003
 Stark Raving Jams, 2004
 Glass Harp Live At The Beachland Ballroom 11.01.08, 2010

Collaborative works
With Muriel Anderson
 Uncut Gems, 2003. Featuring contributions from special guest Stanley Jordan.
With Mike Pachelli
 Two of Us (Groovemasters Volume 10) Solid Air, 2006
With Jeff Johnson
 Frio Suite, 2009
 WaterSky, 2012
 WinterSky Live, 2015
 Cappadocia, 2019
With Tyler Bender Band
The Rain, 2009
With Randy Stonehill
 Together Live!, 2005
 Mystery Highway, 2009
With Scott Dente and Wes King
 Invention, 1997
With Jerry Marotta and Tony Levin
 The Bucket List, 2019
With Rex Paul
 Illumination, 2019
With Mike Pachelli
 Adventure-us, 2022

Selected list of session work
 Honeytree, The Way I Feel, 1974
 Joe Vitale, Roller Coaster Weekend, 1974
 Paul Clark & Friends, Come Into His Presence, 1974
 2nd Chapter of Acts, In the Volume of the Book, 1975
 Honeytree, Evergreen, 1975
 Paul Clark & Friends, Good To Be Home, 1975
 John Fischer, Inside, 1977
 2nd Chapter of Acts, The Roar of Love, 1978 (Released 1980)
 Nedra Ross, Full Circle, 1978
 Matthew Ward, Toward Eternity, 1979
 Michael and Stormie Omartian, Seasons of the Soul, 1979
 Michael and Stormie Omartian, The Builder, 1980
 Andraé Crouch, Don't Give Up, 1981
 Paul Clark, A New Horizon, 1981
 John Mehler, Bow and Arrow, 1982
 Michele Pillar, Michele Pillar, 1982.
 Paul Clark, Drawn To The Light, 1982
 Mylon LeFevre, More, 1983
 Randy Stonehill, Celebrate This Heartbeat, 1984
 Jamie Owens-Collins, A Time For Courage, 1985
 Paul Clark, Out Of The Shadow, 1985
 Greg X. Volz, The River Is Rising, 1986. Keaggy plays guitar on "Hold On to the Fire"
 Twila Paris, Same Girl, 1987
 Mark Farner, Just Another Injustice, 1988
 Randy Stonehill, Can't Buy A Miracle, 1988
 Sheila Walsh, Say So, 1988
 Tim Miner, I Know You Think You Know, 1988
 Tony Guerrero, Tiara, 1988
 Phil and John, Don't Look Now...It's The Hallelujah Brothers, 1989
 Bruce Carroll, The Great Exchange, 1990. Keaggy plays guitar on "Living in the Pages"
 David Mullen, Faded Blues, 1991. Keaggy plays guitar on "After the Hurricane"
 Twila Paris, Sanctuary, 1991
 Michael Card, The Word, 1992. Keaggy plays acoustic guitar on "A Valley Of Dry Bones"
 Michael Card, Joy In the Journey, 1992. Keaggy plays acoustic guitar on "So Many Books"
 Amy Grant,  Home for Christmas (Amy Grant album), 1992. Keaggy plays acoustic guitar on "O Come All Ye Faithful"
 Love Song, Welcome Back, 1994
 Randy Stonehill, Lazarus Heart, 1994
 John Sferra, Northbound, 1995
 Carman, Mission 3:16, 1998. Keaggy plays guitar on "Surf Mission"
 Michael W. Smith, Christmastime (album), 1998. "O Christmas Tree" an instrumental duet featuring Michael W. Smith on piano and Keaggy on acoustic and electric guitars.
 Phil Madeira, 3 Horseshoes, 1999
 Steve Bell, Waiting for Aidan, electric guitar on "Jesus My Glory" and "Somebody's Gotta Pay", 2001
 Kirk Whalum, The Christmas Message, 2001. Keaggy plays guitar on the title track.
 Cheri Keaggy, Let's Fly, 2001
 Randy Stonehill, Edge of the World "That's the Way It Goes", "We Were All So Young", 2002
 Michael Card, Scribbling in the Sand: The Best of Michael Card, 2002. Keaggy plays acoustic guitar on "The Poem of Your Life".
 David Wilcox, Into the Mystery, 2003
 P.O.D., Payable on Death, "Revolution" and "Eternal", 2003
 Dispatch, All Points Bulletin, 2003
 Neal Morse, One, 2004. Electric guitar solo in "The Creation" at 8:25, Acoustic guitar solo in "The Man's Gone" (Reprise), 2nd Lead Vocals on "Cradle to the Grave."
 Kim Hill, Real Christmas, 2004. Keaggy accompanies Hill on "God Rest Ye Merry Gentlemen"
 Sara Groves, Station Wagon, 2004
 Frisk Luft, I'll Never Find Another You, 2004. Keaggy performs on "Son of Man" and "I'll Never Find Another You".
 David Wilcox, Out Beyond Ideas, 2005
 Honeytree, Call of the Harvest, 2005
 Braddigan, Watchfires, 2005. Keaggy plays lead guitar on several tracks.
 The Sunrise, We Have Not Heard, 2012. Keaggy featured on several tracks.
 Micky Dolenz, Remember, 2012
 Jason Truby, Passages, 2013. Keaggy plays guitar on "New Creation"
 James Shepard, Always, 2014. Keaggy produces two of the songs on this album.
 Jean Watson, Christmas...Not The Way It Seems, 2015. Keaggy plays guitar on "Do You Hear What I Hear?"
 Jean Watson, Steady My Gaze, 2015. Keaggy plays guitar on several songs
 Jerry Gaskill, Love & Scars, 2015
 The Key of David, A Different Dream, 2016
 Union of Sinners and Saints, Union of Sinners and Saints, 2016
 Neal Morse, Morsefest "2015" Question Mark and Sola Scriptura, 2017
 Jean Watson, Sacred, 2018. Guest performance by Keaggy

Videos
 Phil Keaggy in Concert: St. Charles IL, 2004 (DVD)
 Philly Live!, 2004 (DVD)
 Phil Keaggy and Randy Stonehill: Together Live!, 2005 (DVD)
 Electric Guitar Style, 2005 (Instructional DVD)
 Acoustic Guitar Style, 2005 (Instructional DVD)
 Glass Harp LIVE Circa '72 (DVD), 2006
 The Master & the Musician: 30 Years Later Tour, 2008 (DVD)

Keaggy also appears on the video Muriel Anderson's All Star Guitar Night Concert, 2000. The two guitarists team up for a performance of "Tennessee Morning" from Keaggy's 220 album. Keaggy accompanies Michael Card on "The Poem of Your Life" in Card's 2002 concert video Scribbling in the Sand: The Best of Michael Card.

References

External links
Full Discography

 
Folk music discographies
Discographies of American artists
Christian music discographies